Sarısalkım, historically and still informally called İsbatrin, is a village in the Şahinbey District, Gaziantep Province, Turkey. The village is inhabited by Turkmens of the Elbegli tribe and had a population of 3512 in 2022.

References

Villages in Şahinbey District